Eli Bowen (October 14, 1844 – May 4, 1924) was an American sideshow performer known as "The Legless Wonder", or "The Legless Acrobat". He was also billed as "The Handsomest Man in Showbiz" and the "Wonder of the Wide, Wide World".

Early years
Eli Bowen was born in Richland County, Ohio, to Robert and Sarah Bowen with his undeveloped feet attached to the hips due to a rare birth defect – the so-called seal limbs, which was caused by a genetic disorder phocomelia. His other seven siblings were of normal complexion and they all loved and supported their impaired brother. He learned to walk on his hands using wooden blocks, and soon acquired enough strength in his torso to start experimenting with acrobatics.  According to the literature, in 1857, at age 13 he joined the traveling circus group Major Brown's Colosseum, where he was performing acrobatic tumbling, such as cartwheels, somersaults, and backflips. However, 1860 census records demonstrate that he was living with his parents and attended school. Only starting from 1870 census, after his father's death in 1865, did Bowen begin to describe his occupation as "showman".

Career
In 1876, Bowen joined Pullman Brothers Side Show, and after three years Cooper, Bailey & Co. In 1897, he performed for Barnum & Bailey Circus in England. He was billed as "The Legless Acrobat", and became famous for his acrobatic work on top of a thirteen-foot pole. Sometimes, he collaborated with Armless Wonder Charles Tripp, and they both were pedaling and steering a tandem bicycle quipping at each other: "Watch your steps" and "Keep your hands off me". Bowen's artistic life with small carnival sideshows and big circuses run by James Anthony Bailey and  P. T. Barnum spanned half a century. At age 79 he continued to work for Coney Island Dreamland Circus Side Show.

Personal life

When he was 26, Bowen married Martha N. Haines (sometimes described as Mattie Haight), 16, and they raised four healthy sons named Frank, Robert, Adrian and Victor. The fliers given to the spectators specified that one became a judge and another a successful merchant.

A brief history of his life was retold in a pamphlet The Wonder of the Wide, Wide World: The True History of Mr. Eli Bowen which was published in 1880.

On May 4, 1924, Bowen died at the Dreamland circus in Coney Island from pleurisy, which was caused by pneumonia. He was buried in Lowell, Indiana.

References

External links

 
 Eli Bowen, Circus Performer: 1850–1880 Census records

1844 births
1924 deaths
People with phocomelia
Acrobats
American circus performers
Sideshow performers